Events from the year 1967 in China.

Incumbents 
 Chairman of the Chinese Communist Party – Mao Zedong
 President of the People's Republic of China – Liu Shaoqi
 Premier of the People's Republic of China – Zhou Enlai
 Chairman of the National People's Congress – Zhu De
 Vice President of the People's Republic of China – Soong Ching-ling and Dong Biwu
 Vice Premier of the People's Republic of China – Lin Biao

Governors 
 Governor of Anhui Province – Huang Yan
 Governor of Fujian Province – Wei Jinshui then Han Xianchu
 Governor of Gansu Province – Deng Baoshan then Xian Henghan 
 Governor of Guangdong Province – Chen Yu (until November), Huang Yongsheng (starting November)
 Governor of Guizhou Province – Li Li then Ma Li 
 Governor of Hebei Province – Liu Zihou 
 Governor of Heilongjiang Province – Pan Fusheng (starting unknown)
 Governor of Henan Province – Wen Minsheng (starting unknown)
 Governor of Hubei Province – Zhang Tixue (until unknown)
 Governor of Hunan Province – Cheng Qian (until unknown)
 Governor of Jiangsu Province – Hui Yuyu (until unknown)
 Governor of Jiangxi Province – Fang Zhichun (until unknown)
 Governor of Jilin Province – Li Youwen (until unknown), Wang Huaixiang (starting unknown)
 Governor of Liaoning Province – Huang Oudong (until unknown)
 Governor of Qinghai Province – Wang Zhao then Liu Xianquan 
 Governor of Shaanxi Province – Li Ruishan 
 Governor of Shandong Province – Bai Rubing then Wang Xiaoyu 
 Governor of Shanxi Province – Wang Qian then Liu Geping 
 Governor of Sichuan Province – vacant
 Governor of Yunnan Province – vacant
 Governor of Zhejiang Province – vacant

Events 

 Nathu La and Cho La incidents
 Daoxian massacre
 Red Guards (China)
 Shanghai People's Commune
 Test No. 6
 Wuhan Incident

Births 

 Lu Hao (born 1967)
 Zhou Danhong
 Wang Tao (footballer, born 1967)
 Cao Mianying
 Shu Qingquan
 He Zhuoqiang

Deaths 

 Yao Min
 Ye Yuanlong
 Zhou Zuoren
 Zhao Erlu
 Jiang Guangnai
 Li Lisan

See also
1967 in Chinese film

References